Mimi Heinrich (1 November 1936 – 31 May 2017) was a Danish actress and writer. Outside Denmark she was mostly known for her roles in the cult movies Reptilicus and Journey to the Seventh Planet. She had her debut at the Det Ny Teater in 1957 and starred in 19 Danish movies between 1953 and 1964.

From 1962 to 1974, she lived in the United States. Heinrich was married three times. The first time was with the American writer Kells Elvins (a close friend of William S. Burroughs) who died in 1962. The second time to Joseph Dubin – head of the legal department of Universal Studios, whom she later divorced and with whom she had two daughters, the painter Maria Dubin and film producer Kristina Dubin. After returning to Denmark, she married the Danish painter Christian Reesen Magle with whom she had a son, the composer Frederik Magle.

After returning to Denmark she worked primarily as a writer. She died on 31 May 2017.

References

External links

1936 births
2017 deaths
Danish film actresses
Danish stage actresses
Actresses from Copenhagen